Chargan Ridge (‘Rid Chargan’ \'rid char-'gan\ is the mostly ice-covered ridge extending 9.5 km in southeast-northwest direction, 5.4 km wide and rising to 2149 m in the west foothills of Bruce Plateau on Graham Coast in Graham Land, Antarctica.  It has steep and partly ice-free northwest and northeast slopes, and surmounts Pollard Glacier to the northeast, Comrie Glacier to the north, and Bradford Glacier to the west and southwest.

The ridge is named after the settlement of Chargan in Southeastern Bulgaria.

Location
British mapping in 1971.

Maps
British Antarctic Territory. Scale 1:200000 topographic map. DOS 610 Series, Sheet W 65 64. Directorate of Overseas Surveys, Tolworth, UK, 1971.
 Antarctic Digital Database (ADD). Scale 1:250000 topographic map of Antarctica. Scientific Committee on Antarctic Research (SCAR). Since 1993, regularly upgraded and updated.

Notes

References
 Bulgarian Antarctic Gazetteer. Antarctic Place-names Commission. (details in Bulgarian, basic data in English)
Chargan Ridge. SCAR Composite Gazetteer of Antarctica.

External links
 Chargan Ridge. Copernix satellite image

Ridges of Graham Land
Bulgaria and the Antarctic
Graham Coast